is a 2014 Japanese musical comedy film written and directed by Masayuki Suo, starring Mone Kamishiraishi, Hiroki Hasegawa, and Sumiko Fuji. It screened in competition at the 2014 Shanghai International Film Festival on June 16, 2014. It was released in Japan on September 13, 2014.

Cast
Mone Kamishiraishi as Haruko Saigo
Hiroki Hasegawa as Noritsugu Kyono
Sumiko Fuji as Chiharu Kojima
Tomoko Tabata as Momoharu
Tamiyo Kusakari as Satoharu
Eri Watanabe as Mameharu
Naoto Takenaka as Tomio Aoki
Masahiro Takashima as Yoshio Takai
Gaku Hamada as Shuhei Nishino
Ittoku Kishibe as Orikichi Kitano
Fumiyo Kohinata as Kanpachiro Ichikawa
Satoshi Tsumabuki as Yuichiro Akagi
Jurina Matsui as Fukuna
Tomu Muto as Fukuha

Reception
Elizabeth Kerr of The Hollywood Reporter commented that "[Masayuki Suo] brings the same light, optimistic touch to bear as he did with his best known films, Sumo Do, Sumo Don't and Shall We Dance?, which similarly revolved around gently non-conformist characters doing (and enjoying) what they shouldn’t in rigid Japan."

Derek Elley of Film Business Asia wrote: "With no romance between pupil and master, the film lacks a strong emotional arc to involve an audience; in its place is just Haruko's own story of wanting to become a geisha, and here Kamishiraishi's performance as the underdog who eventually triumphs manages to carry the day." Mark Shilling of The Japan Times gave the film 3 and a half stars out of 5, saying, "Kamishiraishi, the 16-year-old newcomer who beat out 800 other aspirants for the lead role, is a diminutive vocal dynamo and a good fit as the country-girl heroine, right down to her native Kagoshima dialect."

Kwenton Bellette of Twitch Film felt that "[the] beautiful tourist-baiting scenes of Kyoto and the geisha district are brought to vivid life thanks to the detail-laden environment and costume design although the film contains itself to one tea-house through the majority of its length." Maggie Lee of Variety wrote: "Craft contributions are aces, the richly costumed and decorated production presenting Kyoto's landscaped gardens, seasonal scenery and architecture to most pleasing effect."

It debuted at number 5 at the Japanese box office on its opening weekend, earning $1 million from 91,800 admissions.

Awards
 69th Mainichi Film Award for Best Music (Yoshikazu Suo)
38th Japan Academy Prize for Best Music (Yoshikazu Suo)

References

External links
 

2014 films
2010s musical films
Films shot in Japan
Films directed by Masayuki Suo
Toho films
Japanese musical films
2010s Japanese films
2010s Japanese-language films